Newcastle Diamonds were a motorcycle speedway team that raced in the SGB Championship, every Sunday night during the season (March–October) from their home at the Newcastle Stadium on the Fossway, Byker. The Stadium was previously known as Brough Park.

History

1929 to 1951 
The club were inaugural members of the 1929 Speedway English Dirt Track League finishing in fourth place and then raced a single season of Northern League in 1930. The club did not race league speedway again until 1938 when they joined the National League. In 1946, the team raced as Newcastle Brough and in 1949 as Newcastle Magpies. From 1952 to 1960 the team did not race in the league.

1960 to 1970
Newcastle returned in 1961 competing in the Provincial League and later won their first major trophy, winning the 1964 Provincial Speedway League, led by Ivan Mauger who would go on to become six times World Champion. In 1967, Ole Olsen made his British debut for Newcastle and would later be a three times World Champion.

1975 to 1984
After competing in the British League from 1965 to 1970 the team missed four seasons (1971–1974) before returning in 1975. The following season they won the double of National League title and Knockout Cup. The 1976 team was Tom Owen, Ron Henderson, Joe Owen, Andy Cusworth, Brian Havelock, Phil Michelides and Rob Blackadder.
Another double of league and cup came their way during the 1982 National League season, when led by Joe Owen, Rod Hunter and Bobby Beaton. One year later, led by the same three riders they won their third National League title and the Fours title during the 1983 National League season. The competed in the British League in 1984.

1985-2009
After missing 1985 they were renamed the Newcastle Federation Specials for the 1986 National League season. They missed the 1988 season and continued to compete in the second tier. In 1992, rider Wayne Garratt died in hospital after crashing at the track, the fourth person to do so since 1946, including Chris Prime in 1978. Newcastle won their fifth league title during the 2001 Premier League speedway season; their top rider that season was Bjarne Pedersen.

2010-2022 
The 2010 season was a very successful campaign for the Diamonds. Although the Edinburgh Monarchs dominated the League, it was the Diamonds that took most silverware of the season by winning the Premier League Play-Offs (Against Sheffield Tigers), the Premier Trophy (against Birmingham Brummies) and the Premier League KOC (against Edinburgh Monarchs). The Diamonds also found success in the Super7even events, when the Dane Kenni Larsen won the Premier League Riders Championship to add a fourth honour to the club's successful season. Fellow Dane Rene Bach encountered further success away from the club by helping Denmark to win the under 21 world cup with a 15-point maximum, and by winning the Danish Under 21s Championship. In recognition of their achievements the team was awarded the prestigious 'Team of the Year' award by Sports North-East, shortly before the 2011 campaign commenced, ahead of the Championship League winning football side Newcastle United.

Robert Lambert, who rode for the Diamonds during the 2016 and 2017 seasons, was crowned both British Under 21 and European Under 19 Champion in 2017. He, alongside Steve Worrall (who rode for the Diamonds in 2012, 2014, 2015, 2016 and 2017) represented Great Britain in the World Team Cup during the 2017 season. GB won event one at King's Lynn where both Lambert and Worrall scored 13 points each, helping the team to qualify for the World Team Cup Final in Leszno, Poland.

On 16 September 2018, Newcastle Diamonds legend Stuart Robson announced his retirement from the sport. He first rode for the Diamonds at the age of 16 in 1993. Newcastle Diamonds' celebrated their 90th anniversary season in 2019. After the 2019 season Rob Grant and former Stoke Potters promoter Dave Tattum took ownership of the club.

Going into 2022, speedway clubs in the UK were challenged by the impacts of Brexit and European rider availability. The club had already come close to closing in 2021 before ultimately committing to a second league season under Grant's ownership. Grant cited a rider shortage and low crowd numbers as reasons for temporarily closing the club in June 2022, with the goal of maintaining the club's financial resources to resume in 2023. Grant also cited his other business ventures, finances, and mental health as reasons to close the club before the completion of the league season. Speedway promoter and BSP Chairman Rob Godfrey stated that "[w]e had been working with the Newcastle promotion in an attempt to get them to the end of the season...but sadly that’s proved not to be the case."

2006 season

Team
 
 
 
 
 
 
 

‡ 
†

2007 season

Team
 
 
 
 
 
 
 

Also Rode:
 ‡

2008 season

Team
 
 
 
 
 
 
 

Also Rode:
 ‡
 ‡
 ‡
 †

2009 season

2009 team and statistics
 
 
 
 
 
 
 

Also rode:
  (Released)
  (Released)
  (Released)

80th anniversary series
In 2009 to commemorate the Diamonds 80th anniversary a series of 50 cigarette cards were produced by the club. Riders included:

2010 season

Season overview: triple champions
Performance in national competitions

2010 team and statistics
Greensheet averages
The following averages take into account league and trophy matches only, excluding playoffs, semi-finals, and finals. These averages are used for team building purposes and riding order.

Note: British riders have 2.5% reduction on their 2010 averages.
Also Rode: ‡ ,  

All match averages
The following averages take into account all matches including Knockout Cup and Playoffs.

Number of maximums

Fastest times
The following are the riders fastest times around the Brough Park track.

2011 season 

Season overview
Performance in national competitions

2011 team and statistics

Note: British riders have 2.5% reduction on their 2010 averages.

2011 fixtures / results

Note: Top scorer in italics, indicates a full or paid maximum.
Fixtures: TTW: Tyne/Tweed Trophy, CHAL: Challenge, PS: Premier Shield, PL: Premier League
Coloring: Green: Won, Red: Lost, Yellow: Draw, Blue: Lost, but still gained league points (PL matches only)

2018 season 

Personnel
 George English, Andrew Dalby & Martin Phillips (club owners)
 George English & Martin Phillips (club promoters)
 Boiler Technical Services (team sponsor)

Performance in national competitions

Team and statistics
Averages below are green sheet averages based on BSPA (as at 1 October 2018):

2019 season 

The full team was confirmed on 22 December 2018 with only Matthew Wethers retained from the 2018 season. Thomas Jorgensen joined the Diamonds following 2018 with neighbours and rivals Redcar Bears. Danny Phillips was on loan from the Diamonds at Scunthorpe during 2018. Max Clegg travelled south from Edinburgh Monarchs, while Steve Worrall and Simon Lambert were late additions to the team from Workington. Finally, Lasse Bjerre, younger brother of Newcastle legend Kenneth Bjerre who started his British career with the Diamonds in the early 2000s before going on to star in the Speedway Grand Prix series, was on the team.

Personnel
 George English, Andrew Dalby & Martin Phillips (club owners)
 George English & Martin Phillips (club promoters)
 Technical Services (team sponsor)

Team and statistics

 Steve Worrall 7.97*
 Thomas Jorgensen 7.66
 Lasse Bjerre 7.08
 Matthew Wethers 5.78
 Simon Lambert 4.18
 Max Clegg 3.17
 Danny Phillips 2.00

2020 to 2022 seasons 

The 2020 SGB Championship season was cancelled due to the COVID-19 pandemic. In 2020, Newcastle entered a junior team, named the Newcastle Gems to compete in the National Development League National Trophy competition.

2021

Personnel Robert Grant Jnr (club owner)
 Robert Grant Jnr & Dave Tattum (club promoters)
 Grant's Event Catering (team sponsor)

2021 team
 Ben Barker 7.07
 Matthew Wethers 7.03
 Max Clegg 4.98
 Connor Mountain 4.95
 Adam Roynon 4.00
 James Wright 4.00
 Archie Freeman 1.002022 season'''

2002 team
 Bradley Wilson-Dean 8.21
 Paul Starke
 Matthew Wethers
 Max Clegg
 James Wright
 Kyle Bickley
 Lee Complin

Season summary

Season summary (juniors)

Club honours

Team honours
19 Titles
 Provincial League Champions - 1964
 National League Champions - 1976, 1982, 1983
 Premier League Champions - 2001
 National League Knockout Cup Winners - 1976, 1982
 Premier League Knockout Cup Winners - 2010
 Premier Trophy Winners - 2010
 Premier League Playoff Winners - 2010
 Premier Shield Winners - 2011.
 Supernational Winners - 1982, 1983
 Gold Cup Winners - 1991, 1992
 National League Four-Team Championship Winners - 1976, 1982, 1983
 National League Best Pairs Winners - Tom Owen & Brian Havelock (1975)

Individual honours
 World Champions - Ivan Mauger (1968)
 National League Riders Championship - Joe Owen (1976, 1982)
 Provincial League Riders Championship - Ivan Mauger (1963, 1964)
 Premier League Riders Championship - Kenni Larsen (2010)

Regional honour
 Sport Newcastle Team of the Year - 2010

Notable Newcastle riders

Highest averaged rider

Rider of the Year
As nominated by supporters:
 2011:  Stuart Robson
 2010:  Kenni Larsen
 2009:  Mark Lemon
 2008:  Jason King
 2007:  Sean Stoddart
 2006:  Christian Henry

Hall of fame riders/managers
There are currently three inductees in the Diamonds hall of fame:
  Ivan Mauger
  Tom Owen
  Kenni Larsen

References

Speedway Premier League teams
Sport in Newcastle upon Tyne
SGB Championship teams
Speedway British League Division Two / National League